Galveston is the twelfth  studio album by American country music singer-songwriter Glen Campbell, released in March 1969 by Capitol Records. The album was a major hit for Campbell, reaching number one on the Billboard Country Albums chart, and generated the number one hit single on the Hot Country Singles and Easy Listening charts, "Galveston", written by Jimmy Webb, who also wrote the follow-up single, "Where's the Playground Susie", which peaked at number 28 on the Hot Country Singles chart and number 10 on the Easy Listening chart.
The front cover is a photograph of Galveston Beach, Galveston, Texas.

Critical response
In his review for Allmusic, Bruce Eder gave the album four and a half out of five stars, calling it "a smooth, lively, sentimental, and occasionally even exciting album." Eder concluded that the album "shows off the romantic, the virtuoso, and the country sides of Campbell's persona about as well as any album he ever cut."

Track listing
Side 1
 "Galveston" (Jimmy Webb) – 2:39
 "Take My Hand for a While" (Buffy Sainte-Marie) – 2:41
 "If This Is Love" (Glen Campbell, Bill Ezell) – 2:08
 "Today" (Randy Sparks) – 2:29
 "Gotta Have Tenderness" (Ramona Redd, Mitch Torok) – 2:09
 "Friends" (Dick Bowman, Glen Campbell) – 2:31

Side 2
 "Where's the Playground Susie" (Jimmy Webb) – 2:55
 "Time" (Michael Merchant) – 2:42
 "Until It's Time for You to Go" (Buffy Sainte-Marie) – 3:02
 "Oh What a Woman" (Jerry Hubbard) – 2:39
 "Every Time I Itch I Wind Up Scratchin' You" (Glen Campbell, Jeremy Slate) – 1:51

Personnel
Music
 Glen Campbell – vocals, acoustic and electric guitars
 Hal Blaine – drums
 Al Casey – acoustic guitar
 Bob Felts – drums
 Dennis McCarthy – piano
 Joe Osborn – bass guitar
 Tony Terran – trumpet

Production
 Al De Lory – producer, arranger, conductor

Charts
Album – Billboard (United States)

Singles – Billboard (United States)

References

Glen Campbell albums
1969 albums
Capitol Records albums
Albums recorded at Capitol Studios
Country albums by American artists